Velga Krile (1945–1991) was a Latvian poet and playwright. She has been cited as one of Latvia's most talented poets on the scene in the late 1970s, along with Uldis Berzins, Leons Briedis, Mara Misina, Māra Zālīte and Klavs Elsbergs. She was a member of the Writer's Union of Latvia. She committed suicide in 1991.

Works

Poems
 „Dzeltenās palodzes” (1966),
 „Bērzi” (1976),
 „Gaismēna” (1979),
 „Es diennaktī esmu” (1982),
 „Nepiekrāp mani” (1985),
 „Uz zāles fona” (1989),
 „Uz tā tālā ceļa” (1991).

Plays 
 "Orfejs un Eiridike”(1968),
 „Dimanta dziesma” (1969.),
 „Stepans Razins” (1969./70.),
 „Vanems Imanta” (1972.),
 „Ivans Bargais” (1973.),
 „Vietlavs un Veseta” (1976.),
 „Asaras”(farss)(1976.),
 ”Katastrofa” (1979.),
 „Vai jūs baiļojaties, jūs, mazticīgie!” (1980.),
 „N-tā pilsēta” (1983.),
 „Nebukadnecars” (1983./84.),
 „Kains” (1984.),
 „Leģenda” (1984./85.),
 „Tronis un mīlestība” (1985.),
 „Svētlaimīgo sala” (1987.),
 „Manā zemē ir tādi vārdi…” (1990.)

References

1945 births
1991 suicides
People from Valka Municipality
Latvian dramatists and playwrights
20th-century Latvian poets
20th-century dramatists and playwrights
Latvian women writers
20th-century Latvian women writers
Suicides in Latvia